John K. Thornton is an American historian specializing in the history of Africa, the African Diaspora and the Atlantic world. He is a professor in the history department at Boston University.

Biography

Early life and education
Thornton was born 3 May 1949 in Fort Monroe, Virginia.  His father, Col. Robert L. Thornton, was then serving in the US Air Force, eventually becoming a professor of Business Administration at Miami University in Oxford, Ohio.  His mother, Mary E. (Kelly) Thornton, a classicist, was also later a professor at Miami U.  His sister is novelist Betsy Thornton. His daughter Amara Thornton is a historian of archaeology working in the United Kingdom.   He was educated at the University of Michigan (1971) and UCLA (1972 and PhD 1979).  He is married to fellow Africanist historian and collaborator Linda Heywood.

Career
Thornton held various history faculty positions in the United States and Africa during the 1980s including the University of Zambia, Allegheny College and the University of Virginia. He joined the faculty at Millersville University in 1986 and joined the Boston University faculty in fall 2003.

Works
Thornton focused initially on the history of the Kingdom of Kongo. From the start of this work, Thornton became convinced that the status of Kongo as a Christian country had not been fully recognized through his work on missionary baptismal statistics which he sought to show reflected large scale baptism and used this material to write a treatise on Kongo demography. His work on baptismal records resulted in the publication of the article "Demography and History in the Kingdom of Kongo" (1977), and a contribution on another baptismal document in the First Edinburgh Conference on African Historical Demography (1978).

Thornton's thesis, published as The Kingdom of Kongo:  Civil War and Transition, 1641–1718 (Madison, 1983) advanced the idea that Kongo's centralization was the result of a massive buildup of slave-worked plantations in the vicinity of its capital during the fifteenth through seventeenth centuries, and allowed kings to be overwhelmingly powerful.  However, he argued, the persistent civil wars of the seventeenth century and the rise of a new population center in the coastal province of Soyo led to the depopulation of São Salvador and the loss of its centralization.  In addition to this larger theme, Thornton also tried to integrate a history from below description of daily life and culture in the country by mining carefully the extensive documentation of the Capuchin missionaries in the country.  In this work, he deliberately ignored using either earlier or later materials and much of the ethnographic materials so as to determine continuity and change in the kingdom.  Thornton would return to this theme in writing the biography of D Beatriz Kimpa Vita in showing the daily life of Kongo in her times (1684–1706).

Thornton's second book, Africa and Africans in the Making of the Atlantic World, 1400–1650 (Cambridge University Press, 1992, the second edition in 1998 extended its framework to 1800) was an examination of the Atlantic portions of Africa and their involvement in the Atlantic slave trade, as well as the impact of Africans in the American countries to which they were carried.  In this work, Thornton sought to demonstrate that Africans had been more active participants in the trade that was previously believed, arguing controversially that African economic strength and power were sufficient to force Europeans to deal with them on their own terms.

At the same time, he also argued that Africans were not stripped of their culture in the Middle Passage and retained most of it in the first generation of their captivity.  He tried to show how African sensibilities continued to be dominant in the first generation of captives in art, music, and language.  He also suggested that resistance in the form of revolts in particular had roots in African military systems, and this last point was pursued in detail in several studies of slave revolts and the Haitian Revolution.

His studies of Africa in the slave trade led him, at the urging of English historian Jeremy Black to write a systematic study of African wars and military culture in the period of the slave trade, which appeared in 1999 as Warfare in Atlantic Africa, 1500–1800 (University College of London, 1999).

In 2007 he and his longtime collaborator (and wife) Linda Heywood published Central Africans, Atlantic Creoles and the Foundation of the Americas, 1585–1660 (Cambridge University Press).  This work demonstrated that thanks to English and Dutch privateering on Portuguese vessels, virtually all the first generation of slaves brought to the colonies of these two countries came from Central Africa.  They then went on to argue that the long contact between this region and Europe, the conversion of many of the people to Christianity, and the adaptation of various European items of culture, they could be considered "Atlantic Creoles" a term popularized by historian Ira Berlin.  Basing themselves of many local archives in the United States, Bermuda, Barbados, England and the Netherlands, they went on to suggest that the Christian background of many early slaves may account for their high manumission rate and their role in cultural foundations of the Americas.

Thornton's work on the African Diaspora had also been accompanied by a growing interest in the indigenous people of the Americas, and their interaction with Europeans.  Inspired by this idea,Thornton turned a course he had been teaching since 1995 into a new book, A Cultural History of the Atlantic World, in 2012.  This book was an attempt to rethink the heritage of the Americas, and particular North America as owing as much or more to the larger Atlantic World as to the extension of Europe.  Thus it sought to have comprehensive coverage of Africa, both American continents and the Caribbean; while at the same time following up the cultural threads he had first explored in Africa and Africans in the Making of the Atlantic World.  The book was awarded the World History Association's annual prize for 2012.

Honors and awards
He shared the 2008 Herskovits Prize for his book (co-authored with Linda Heywood) Central Africans, Atlantic Creoles, and the Foundation of the Americas, 1585–1660.
In 2012, he was awarded the World History Association's annual prize for the best book in world history.
He was elected to the American Academy of Arts and Sciences in 2020

Selected bibliography

Books

The Kingdom of Kongo:  Civil War and Transition, 1641–1718 (Madison:  University of Wisconsin Press, 1983).
Africa and Africans in the Formation of the Atlantic World, 1400–1680 (New York and London:  Cambridge University Press, 1992, second expanded edition, 1998).  Portuguese translation:  África e Africanos na Formação do Mundo Atlântico, 1400–1800 (Rio de Janeiro:  Estampa, 2004); Italian translation, L’Africa e gli africani nella formazione del mondo atlantico, 1400–1800 (Bologna:  Mulino, 2010).
The Kongolese Saint Anthony: Dona Beatriz Kimpa Vita and the Antonian Movement, 1684–1706 (Cambridge: Cambridge University Press, 1998)
Warfare in Atlantic Africa, 1500–1800 (University College of London Press/Routledge, 1999)
(with Linda Heywood), Central Africans, Atlantic Creoles and the Foundation of the Americas, 1585–1660 (Cambridge: Cambridge University Press, 2007)
(ed. and trans.) Evangelical Missions to the Kingdom of Kongo by Giovanni Antonio Cavazzi da Montecuccolo, 1665.  Translation published on internet, presently at http://www.bu.edu/afam/faculty/john-thornton/john-thorntons-african-texts/.
A Cultural History of the Atlantic World, 1250–1820. (Cambridge: Cambridge University Press, 2012).

Articles

"Demography and History in the Kingdom of Kongo, 1550–1750," Journal of African History 18 (1977):  507–30.
"An Eighteenth Century Baptismal Register and the Demographic History of Manguenzo" in C. Fyfe and D. McMaster (eds.) African Historical Demography (Edinburgh:  Centre of African Studies, 1977): 405–16.
"A Resurrection for the Jaga," Cahiers d'Etudes Africaines 18, nos. 69–70 (1978): 223–227.
"A Note on the Archives of the Propaganda Fide and Capuchin Archives," History in Africa 6 (1979): 341–344.
"New Light of Cavazzi's Seventeenth-Century Description of Kongo," History in Africa 6 (1979): 253–264.
"The Slave Trade in Eighteenth Century Angola:  Effects on Demographic Structures" Canadian Journal of African Studies 14 (1980):  417–28.
"The Chronology and Causes of Lunda Expansion to the West, ca. 1700–1852," Zambia Journal of History 1 (1981): 1–13.
"The Demographic Effect of the Slave Trade on Western Africa, 1500–1850" in C. Fyfe and D. McMaster, African Historical Demography, vol. 2 (Edinburgh:  Centre of African Studies, 1981):  691–720.
"The Kingdom of Kongo, ca. 1390–1678:  History of an African Social Formation," Cahiers d'Etudes Africaines 22 (1982):  325–42.
"The Development of an African Catholic Church in the Kingdom of Kongo, 1483–1750," Journal of African History 25 (1984):  147–67.
(with Joseph C. Miller), "The Chronicle as Sources, History, and Hagiography: The Catálogo dos Governadores de Angola," Paideuma 33 (1987): 359–389.
(with Linda M. Heywood), "Demography, Production and Labor:  Central Angola, 1890–1950," in Joel Gregory and Dennis Cordell (eds.), African Population and Capitalism (Boulder and London:  Westview Press, 1987):  241–54.
"Tradition, Documents and the Ife-Benin Relationship" History in Africa 15 (1988):  351–62.
"On the Trail of Voodoo:  African Christianity in Africa and the Americas," The Americas 44 (1988):  261–78.
(with Linda Heywood), "African Fiscal Systems as Demographic Sources:  The Case of the Central Highlands of Angola, 1770–1900," Journal of African History 29 (1988):  213–28.
"The Art of War in Angola, 1575–1680," Comparative Studies in Society and History 30 (1988):  360–78.
"Legitimacy and Political Power: The Case of Queen Njinga (1624–1663),” Journal of African History 32, no. 1 (1991): 25–40.
"African Dimensions of the Stono Rebellion," American Historical Review 96 (1991):  1101–13. Reprinted in Darlene Clark Hine and Ernestine Jenkins, eds. A Question of Manhood: A Reader in US Black Men's History and Masculinity (Indiana University Press, 1999), 115–29; and Mark M Smith, Stono:  Documenting and Interpreting a Southern Slave Revolt, (University of South Carolina Press, 2005), 73–87.
"Pre-Colonial African Industry and the Atlantic Trade, 1500–1800," and "The Historian and the Pre-Colonial African Economy: John Thornton Responds," in African Economic History Review 9 (1992), along with comments by four other historians.
"'I am the Subject of the King of Congo':  African Ideology in the Haitian Revolution," Journal of World History 4, no. 2 (1993): 181–214.
"African Soldiers in the Haitian Revolution," Journal of Caribbean History 25 (1993): 58–80. Reprinted in Laurent Dubois and Julius Scott, eds., Origins of the Black Atlantic:  Rewriting Histories (Routledge, 2010), 195–213.
"Central African Names and African American Naming Patterns," William and Mary Quarterly 3rd series, 50 (1993): 727–42.
"The African Experience of the '20 and Odd Negroes' Arriving in Virginia in 1619", William and Mary Quarterly 3d series, 55 (1998):  421–34.
"The Coromantees:  An African Cultural Group in Colonial North America and the Caribbean", Journal of Caribbean History 32/1-2 (1998): 161–78.
"War, the State, and Religious Norms in Coromantee Thought", in Robert Blair St. George (ed.), Possible Pasts: Becoming Colonial in America (Ithaca:  Cornell University Press, 2000), 181–200.
"Early Kongo-Portuguese Relations, 1483–1575:  A New Interpretation" History in Africa 8 (1981):  183–204.  French translation in Cahiers des Anneaux de la Mémoire 3 (2001).
"The Origins and Early History of the Kingdom of Kongo, c. 1350–1550", International Journal of African Historical Studies 34/1 (2001): 1–31.
(with Paula Gershick-Ben Amos) "Civil War in the Kingdom of Benin, 1689–1722: Continuity or Political Change?"  Journal of African History 42 (2001): 353–76.
"Religion and Cultural Life in the Kongo and Mbundu Areas, 1500–1800", in Linda Heywood (ed.), Central Africans and Cultural Transformations in the American Diaspora (New York: Cambridge University Press, 2002), 71–90.
"Cannibals, Witches and Slave Traders in the Atlantic World," William and Mary Quarterly 60/2 (2003): 273–94.
"Origin, Traditions, and History in Central Africa," African Arts 37, no. 1 (2004): 32–94.
“Elite Women in the Kingdom of Kongo:  Historical Perspectives on Women’s Political Power,” Journal of African History 47 (2006):  437–60.
(with Linda Heywood), "Central African Leadership and the Appropriation of European Culture", in Peter Mancall, ed., The Atlantic World and Virginia, 1550–1624 (Chapel Hill, NC:  University of North Carolina Press, 2007), 194–224.
"Les États de l’Angola et la formation de Palmares (Brésil),” Annales: Histoire, Sciences sociales 63/4 (2008): 769–97.
(with Linda Heywood) "Kongo and Dahomey, 1660–1815: African Political Leadership in the Era of the Slave Trade and Its Impact on the Formation of African Identity in Brazil", in Bernard Bailyn, ed. Soundings in Atlantic History: Latent Structures and Intellectual Currents, 1500–1825 (Cambridge MA:  Harvard University Press, 2009), 86–111.
"African Political Ethics and the Slave Trade", in D. R. Peterson, ed. Abolitionism and Imperialism in Britain, Africa and the Atlantic.  (Oxford, OH:  Ohio University Press, 2009), 58–93.
(with Linda Heywood) "'Canniball Negroes,' Atlantic Creoles, and the Identity of New England's Charter Generation," African Diaspora 4, no. 1 (2011): 76–94.
"Afro-Christian Syncretism in the Kingdom of Kongo," Journal of African History 54, no. 1 (2013): 53–77.
"The Kingdom of Kongo and the Counter Reformation," Social Sciences and Missions 26 (2013): 40–58.
"Conquest and Theology: The Jesuits in Angola, 1548–1650," Journal of Jesuit Studies 1 (2014): 245–259.

"The Kingdom of Kongo and the Thirty Years' War," Journal of World History 27, no. 2 (2016): 189-213.
 "The Igbo and the African Backgrounds of the Slave Cargo of the Henrietta Marie", in Toyin Falola and Rafael Chijioke Njoku, eds., Igbo in the Atlantic World: African Origins and Diasporic Destinations (Bloomington: Indiana University Press, 2016), pp. 99–111.
"Placing the Military in African History: A Reflection," Journal of African Military History 1, no. 1 (2017): 112–119.
"The Zambos and the Transformation of the Miskitu Kingdom, 1636–1740," Hispanic American Historical Review 97, no. 1 (2017): 1–28.

References

21st-century American historians
21st-century American male writers
Historians of Africa
University of Michigan alumni
University of California, Los Angeles alumni
Boston University faculty
Living people
American male non-fiction writers
1949 births